General Black may refer to:

Scott C. Black (born 1952), U.S. Army lieutenant general
William Murray Black (1855–1933), U.S. Army major general
Wilsone Black (1837–1909), British Army major general

See also
Attorney General Black (disambiguation)